Indrani Pal-Chaudhuri is a multidisciplinary artist, film director, fashion and documentary photographer, public speaker, television personality, Princeton University educator, founder and chief marketing officer, known mononymously as "Indrani" for her multi-platform works of art, innovation, and social impact.

An Indian-Canadian-Jamaican-British multi-disciplinary artist and social justice advocate, Indrani has collaborated with Lady Gaga, Beyonce, Jennifer Lopez, Alicia Keys, Jay-Z, and Kanye West. Her work was discovered by David Bowie and Iman (model) who commissioned her first album cover for "Heathen" and later Bowie launched her directorial debut, commissioning her first major music video, for his song "Valentine's Day" exploring the mind of a high school shooter, on his album The Next Day.

Her work has won the Tribeca Film Festival 2019 Disruptive Innovation Award, where she was described as "A leading director and voice for women's empowerment" the CNN Expose Best Picture Award, and two gold lions at Cannes Festival of Creativity. Her editorial clients include Vogue, GQ, Vanity Fair, Harper's Bazaar, and Interview magazine. Brands such as Nike, Pepsi, L'Oréal Paris, Lancôme, LVMH, Hugo Boss, Anna Sui, Skyy Vodka, and Remy Martin have hired Indrani to create advertising campaigns. Her campaign for Keep A Child Alive raised over 3.5 million dollars and over 1.5 billion impressions, to provide anti-retroviral treatment for families with HIV in Africa and India.

Described as a "rad feminist" by Julianne E. Shepherd, editor-in-chief of Jezebel, and as "an activist filmmaker tackling some of the biggest issues facing the world," Indrani is a human rights, sustainability, diversity, LGBTQIA+ and women's empowerment advocate. Recognized by the United Nations as a Women's Entrepreneurship Distinguished Fellow, a Max Mark-Cranbrook Global Peacemaker, Co-Host of the Global People's Summit at the United Nations, Organizer and Host of the Princeton University Lewis Center "Art of Anti-Racism and Social Justice" symposium, speaker and awards presenter at Davos, World Economic Forum 2022 (TTI). She is also a Princeton University Visiting Lecturer on "Moving Millions with Art and Film for Human Rights and Social Justice."

Early life, model/actor career
Indrani was born in Kolkata, India, in 1983, raised in the historic palace of her traditional Zamindar family, and accompanied her British mother as a volunteer with Mother Teresa and the Ramakrishna Mission. Both her parents were accountants, and her Rastafarian stepfather was a musician and counselor. She witnessed "the devastating poverty that stood in stark contrast to her own childhood" in India, which motivated her to someday make a difference in the area. In Canada she experienced racism with her family and represented her African-Canadian stepfather and her Jamaican family in court against illegal evictions and medications that caused his debilitating diabetes that he ultimately died from.

Indrani began modeling and acting at age 14, to study photography and filmmaking with artists around the world. She was featured in Vogue, Glamour, Elle and Marie Claire, and in campaigns and commercials for Benetton in Japan, MAC Cosmetics, VH1, Luxottica, and Nescafe.

Co-Founding of Shakti Empowerment Education Foundation and South Asian Studies Program
At 18, Indrani returned to India for a 6-month solo pilgrimage, and used her modeling earnings to turn her family home into a charitable school, to give girls a better future. She named the school Shakti Empowerment Education Foundation and currently supports over 300 students, both girls and boys, and provides women with literacy and vocational training, as well as microfinancing, and continues as the school's executive director.

After high school, Indrani met Markus Klinko, a classical harpist, who became a regular collaborator and the two began working together as the photography duo Markus + Indrani. According to Fast Company, "When Markus Klinko and Indrani Pal-Chaudhuri teamed up...both were already stars—Klinko as a classical harpist and Indrani as a fashion model. Now they are famous for their iconic images."

Indrani received a scholarship to Princeton University where she studied cultural anthropology while working as a photographer in NYC. An advocate of cultural regeneration, at Princeton she campaigned and reinstated the study of Sanskrit, and led a student initiative to create a program in South Asian Studies. She graduated with a High Honors AB in Anthropology.

Multidisciplinary Artist
Indrani works as a photographer, a director, director of photography, and producer of films, music videos, and commercials.

While Indrani was a student at Princeton, David Bowie and Iman discovered her photography and commissioned her first album cover for Heathen and I am Iman with Klinko. Indrani's fashion work was discovered by Isabella Blow, who commissioned cover stories for the London Sunday Times. Around the same time, Ingrid Sischy at Interview magazine commissioned various shoots. Indrani credits Blow, Bowie, and Iman for mentoring her and encouraging her to push her creative boundaries. Indrani created album covers for Beyoncé's Dangerously in Love and Lady Gaga's The Fame Monster (Collector's Ed), Mary J. Blige's The Breakthrough and Mariah Carey's comeback Emancipation of Mimi and directed their music videos.

Indrani has created the branding image for clients including Pepsi, Nike, L'Oréal, Shiseido, Lancome, Jaguar, LVMH, Hugo Boss, Anna Sui, Wolford, BNP Paribas, Elizabeth Arden, Pantene, Carol's Daughter and MAC.

In 2013 David Bowie launched Indrani's directorial career with her first major music video for his "Valentine's Day", exploring the mind of a high school mass shooter, and her work and interviews are featured in the HBO / BBC Film "David Bowie: The Last Five Years." Francis Whatley in an interview about the HBO / BBC documentary with Michael Bonner in The Uncut describes Valentine's Day as "Indrani's video. It is compelling. I think she captured something about him – and the story around how she did it is quite interesting...She had to draw out of him that he was singing about a killer."

Indrani's work has been published in over 30 books and shown in over 20 exhibitions, and her portrait of Beyonce is on permanent exhibition at the National Portrait Gallery at the Smithsonian Museum in Washington D.C. In 2013 the Lincoln Center presented a week-long 30-piece public art exhibition Icons, to accompany the release of the photobook, Icons: The celebrity exposures of Markus and Indrani, published by Perseus Press. Icons was described as "High-concept and hyperrealism commingle" by Kimberley Jones for the Austin Chronicle.

She made a video and stills campaign with TBWA-Chiat-Day for Keep a Child Alive against AIDS in India and Africa. Indrani directed a short documentary for PSI and the UN's Nothing But Nets featuring ambassador actress Mandy Moore.  She directed The Girl Epidemic to raise awareness of the millions of girls missing in Asia due to human trafficking, child labor and female infanticide  for Project Nanhi Kali with ad agency Strawberry Frog. Her short "Crescendo," curated by Pepsi's Beats of the Beautiful Game, uses football to empower girls in India in partnership with nonprofits Sambhali Trust, Yuwa, and SEEschool.

An exhibition at the Pacific Design Center LA was presented by the Lucie Foundation in concert with the Month of Photography Los Angeles and the Farmani Gallery, and the Icons Exhibition of her work was presented by The Angel Orensanz Foundation for Contemporary Art NY and Bravo TV to celebrate "Double Exposure" on 16 June 2010.

"The Legend of Lady White Snake" short film, with a poem by famed science fiction writer Neil Gaiman, "The Hidden Chamber" written and directed by Indrani, is a re-imagining of an ancient Asian story, starring Daphne Guinness in costumes by GK Reid and Alexander McQueen.

"Till Human Voices Wake Us", a short film produced by Rick Schwartz, was written and directed by Indrani, creative directed and executive produced by GK Reid, and stars Lindsay Lohan. An inversion of a poem by T.S. Eliot "The Love Song of S. Alfred Prufrock, it is a dream within a dream, of Selkies, Celtic mythical creatures that are women on land and seals in water, who storm Manhattan to save one of their kind, and the oceans. The film reminds viewers of the magic and mysteries of the creatures of the sea, and is a plea for sustainability of the oceans.

Indrani directed numerous music videos including Alicia Keys' "New Day" described as "bold and high-energy" by Jenna Rubenstein for MTV, as well as music videos for Mariah Carey, Bon Jovi, and Mary J. Blige. According to Liz Smith at Variety, "Mary J. Blige attributes her success to many things, among them ... Indrani. They have had a long history of image-creating for Grammy-winning."

For "Girl Rising, India" a feature-length film for girls' empowerment, Indrani directed the Bollywood stars Freida Pinto, Priyanka Chopra, Alia Bhatt, Kareena Kapoor, Nandita Das Priyanka Chopra Sushmita Sen and Madhuri Dixit for the original Indian content, with a video and photo campaign which she also shot, that became part of the Indian government's campaign Beti Bachao, Beti Padhao (translation: Save girl child, educate a girl child).

Her "The Great Artist" was created to destigmatize and encourage discussion on mental health through the lens of the art world, inclusive of the LGBTQ+ and BIPOC communities, who are often underserved and are at greater risk during COVID. The film was created in partnership with various nonprofits, won over 36 awards, screened at the Cannes Film Festival, American Pavilion, 2022, qualified for the Live Action Short Film shortlist for the 93rd Academy Awards, and was selected by The Hollywood Reporter as one of the Oscars' Top 5 Live Action Shorts.

"It is the climax that is truly brilliant -- one that earned the film a consideration for the Live Action Short Film shortlist for the 93rd Academy Awards...Are we all striving to achieve 'greatness' by holding our authentic self hostage? This is the haunting question that Pal-Chaudhuri leaves her viewers with," according to Prerna Mittra of "The Indian Express."

University lecturer, education foundation director, and social justice advocate
Indrani has been involved with social justice advocacy; racial, sexual and LGBTQIA+ equality; women's empowerment; education; health; and environmental sustainability and regeneration. Due to her work in these areas, Indrani was recognized by the United Nations as a Women's Entrepreneurship Distinguished Fellow 2018, and won the 2019 Max Mark-Cranbrook Global Peace Maker Award.

At the age of 18, Indrani co-founded Shakti Empowerment Education, otherwise known as SEEschool.org, turning her family's palace into a foundation and school for economically challenged women and children. Providing free education to 300 children, vocational training, and microfinancing, outside her native Kolkata, India, with an emphasis on the rights of girls. She continues as executive director, "in charge of fundraising, advertising, and development."

Much of Indrani's work and her films focus on the empowerment of women of color, and her work as an abolitionist against human trafficking. Her "Girl Epidemic" short film, on the millions of girls missing in Asia due to child labor, female infanticide, and sex trafficking, was created in partnership with Anand Mahindra's Nanhi Kali Foundation and ad agency Strawberry Frog. Her "Girl Rising India," raises awareness of the importance of girls' empowerment, for which she raised the funding and directed Indian stars, which became central to Indian Prime Minister Modi's "Beti Bachao-Beti Padhao" social awareness campaign (trans: "Save the Daughter, Educate the Daughter"). Her "Crescendo" short film, which became part of Pepsi's "Beats of the Beautiful Game, shows how "sports uplift and empower girls to develop physical and mental strength, discipline, self-confidence, leadership and a sense of community." Her video and stills campaign "Digital Death" for HIV/AIDS in Africa and India, stars Kim Kardashian, Alicia Keys, Janelle Monáe, Serena Williams, and Usher, raised over a million dollars in a week for Keep A Child Alive.

As well as working with over two dozen non-profits, Indrani was Co-Host of the Global People's Summit 2018 during the General Assembly at the United Nations, democratizing access to conversations and information that shapes the world, with the President of the General Assembly and 190 countries live. She is a United Nations Women's Entrepreneurship Distinguished Fellow and is regularly invited to speak at the United Nations Headquarters in New York. She was also Special Advisor to the UNGMDF, its Tech World Forum, Fashion World Forum  and Director of Relations at the UN World Film Forum 2013–2015.

Indrani is a Princeton University Visiting Lecturer on "Moving Millions with Art and Film for Human Rights and Social Justice." She was invited as the keynote speaker at the Princeton University Creative Arts and Humanities Symposium 2018, Princeton's Innovation Engage 2020 on "The Art of Social Change", and at the Princeton Humanities Council's Organizing Stories, she spoke on "Mythography, Digital Storytelling, and Counter-Colonizing the Heteropatriarchal Gaze," with the Center for Human Values, Department of African American Studies and the African Humanities Colloquium, April 2021. Indrani organizes and hosts Princeton Lewis Center's "The Art of Anti-Racism and Social Change" symposium, with actress Mo'Nique, Black Lives Matter NY Co-founder Hawk Newsome, civil rights activist/actress Gina Belafonte, Indigenous activist/actor Eugene Brave Rock (Wonder Woman). She is a keynote speaker at the Harvard University Kennedy School Carr Center for Human Rights Policy's Pride and Progress LGBTQ Film Symposium.

Television personality and media
Indrani is a prolific speaker and TV personality. She has been featured on shows including  Access Hollywood,  America's Next Top Model, and Make Me a Supermodel and  Larry King Live.

Indrani and her work as a director and photographer of David Bowie, were featured on the BBC / HBO Film David Bowie: The Last 5 Years.

Indrani was the subject of a 6-hour docu-series / reality show Double Exposure, depicting her shoots with Lady Gaga, Kim Kardashian, Lindsay Lohan, and others. Her creative partner Klinko and producer GK Reid were also included, documenting their photo shoots from initial thought to hard copy. According to Troy Patterson of Slate, "Themes include the aesthetics of desire, the symbiosis of artist and muse." The show is described by Zoë Ruderman in Cosmopolitan Magazine as "like America's Next Top Model and Project Runway mixed together and on speed."

Created in the US for the Bravo network, Double Exposure has been syndicated in over two hundred countries.

Awards and recognition

 2021 – The Great Artist was Oscar-qualified in 2021
 2021 – Clubhouse "Creator First" Finalist.
 2021 – The Great Artist won Best of Show at the Best Shorts Competition https://bestshorts.net/winners-march-2021/
 2019 – "Max Mark-Cranbrook Global Peacemaker Award" at the Arab American Museum, with the Center for Peace and Conflict Studies, Wayne State, presented by Rotary International.
 2019 – "Disruptive Innovation Award" at the Tribeca Film Festival.
 2019 – "Hall of Distinction Induction" at Havergal College 125 Celebration, Roy Thompson Hall.
 2018 – "Best Picture," CNN Expose Film Awards for The Girl Epidemic.
 2018 – "Women's Entrepreneurship Distinguished Fellow Award," at the United Nations Headquarters. 
 2018 – "Inspirique: Circle of Light" Award at the Harvard University 2018 Global Forum. 
 2016 – "Best Director" at the Los Angeles Independent Film Festival.
 2016 – "Best Picture," and "Best Director" at the London Fashion Film Festival.
 2016 – "Best of New York" at the New York Short Film Festival.
 2016 – "Best Picture," "Best Production Design," "Best Costume Design" and "Best Visual Effects" at the Los Angeles Independent Film Festival.
 2015 – "Best Picture" at the International Fashion Film Awards presented by Cinemoi, at the Saban Theatre, Los Angeles.
 2015 – "Best of Festival" at the Princeton University Film Festival.
 2012 –"Best Picture," "Best Director," "Best Costume Design," "Best Visual Effects" and the "RED Epic Camera Award" at the Museum of Contemporary Art, San Diego, La Jolla Fashion Film Festival.
 2011 – Two Gold Lions at Cannes Festival of Creativity for "Digital Death" video and stills campaign with TBWA-Chiat-Day for Keep a Child Alive against AIDS in India and Africa.
 2007 – "Best of Show" (as Markus + Indrani) at Lucie Awards International Photography Awards.
 2004 – Alex Award for Beyonce's "Dangerously in Love" album cover art.

References

External links
 
 
 Interview at AccessHollywood

Indian women photographers
Indian art directors
Indian fashion photographers
Indian portrait photographers
Indian women film directors
Indian music video directors
Living people
Female models from Kolkata
Indian emigrants to Canada
Canadian women film directors
Canadian music video directors
Canadian art directors
Canadian fashion photographers
Canadian portrait photographers
Canadian expatriates in India
Participants in American reality television series
Photographers from New York (state)
Princeton University alumni
American female models of Indian descent
American film directors of Indian descent
American women artists of Indian descent
Women artists from West Bengal
Photographers from West Bengal
Artists from Kolkata
21st-century American photographers
21st-century Canadian photographers
21st-century Canadian women artists
English women film directors
1983 births
Women graphic designers
Havergal College alumni
21st-century American women photographers
21st-century English women
21st-century English people
21st-century Canadian women
21st-century Canadian people
Asian-Canadian filmmakers